"Ex-Girlfriend" is a song by American ska band No Doubt from their fourth studio album, Return of Saturn (2000). The song was released as the album's lead single in early 2000 and was moderately successful, reaching the top 40 in most countries it charted in, including peaking within the top 10 in Australia, Iceland, and Spain. A review from Billboard magazine called Stefani's vocal performance on the song "fantastic".

Background and writing
Lead singer Gwen Stefani originally composed the song as a dirge about her relationship with Gavin Rossdale, the lead singer of British rock band Bush, whom she married in 2002. After listening to it, the band increased the tempo because the album already included several ballads. The line "you say you're gonna burn before you mellow" is a reference to the lyrics in the Bush song "Dead Meat": "I'm doing you in tomorrow/I'll burn before I mellow".

"Ex-Girlfriend" is a song composed in the key of E minor. It is written in common time and moves at a fast tempo of 168 beats per minute. Stefani's vocal range in the song covers nearly an octave and a half, from G3 to C5. The song features Stefani rapping many of the lyrics rather than singing, and the instrumentals take influence from flamenco (as demonstrated by its guitar riffs), new wave and hip hop.

Chart performance
"Ex-Girlfriend" failed to enter the US Billboard Hot 100 chart but reached number 11 on the Bubbling Under Hot 100. It did manage to find popularity on US alternative rock stations, allowing it to peak at number two on the Modern Rock Tracks chart, becoming No Doubt's highest-charting single on that listing alongside their breakthrough hit single, "Don't Speak". Abroad, the single experienced more success, reaching number six in Iceland and number nine in Australia and Spain, as well as the top 20 in Finland, the Netherlands, New Zealand, Sweden, and Switzerland. In Australia, the song was certified Gold and came in at number 80 on the country's year-end chart for 2000. In the United Kingdom, the song became No Doubt's fifth top-40 hit, debuting and peaking at number 23 on the UK Singles Chart and spending three weeks in the top 100. In Ireland, the song reached number 40 and spent two weeks in the top 50.

Music video

The song's music video, which the video itself indicated was "presented" by Hype Williams, was partially based on the controversial anime Kite. It was filmed  in Los Angeles on January 24–26, 2000. In the video, Stefani cross-dresses to enter a men's bathroom and, upon being discovered, assaults Tony Kanal (who plays her ex-boyfriend) and several other men.  When Kanal regains consciousness, he grabs Stefani and jumps out the window, and the two plummet to the ground. The storyline is cut with scenes of the band playing on a stage.  No Doubt's guitarist Tom Dumont initially played the part of a police officer but was cut from the final version of the "Ex-Girlfriend" video. He enacts the role in MTV's Making the Video.

Track listings

UK CD single
 "Ex-Girlfriend" – 3:30
 "Leftovers" – 4:31
 "Ex-Girlfriend" (CD-ROM video)

UK cassette single
A. "Ex-Girlfriend" – 3:30
B. "Leftovers" – 4:31

International CD single
 "Ex-Girlfriend" – 3:31
 "Leftovers" – 4:31
 "Full Circle" – 3:16
 "Ex-Girlfriend" (video)

Credits and personnel
Credits are lifted from the UK CD single liner notes and the Return of Saturn album booklet.

Studios
 Recorded at various studios in Los Angeles
 Mixed at Ocean Way Recording (Hollywood, California, US)
 Mastered at Gateway Mastering (Portland, Maine, US)

No Doubt
 Gwen Stefani – writing, vocals
 Tony Kanal – writing, bass guitar
 Tom Dumont – writing, guitars
 Adrian Young – drums, percussion

Other musicians
 Gabrial McNair – synthesizer, piano, all keyboard instruments, trombone, horn arrangements
 Stephen Bradley – B trumpet, E trumpet

Other personnel
 Glen Ballard – production
 Karl Derfler – recording
 Scott Campbell, Bryan Carrigan – additional recording
 Jack Joseph Puig – mixing
 Bob Ludwig – mastering
 Sean Beavan – sonic manipulation
 David LaChapelle – photography
 Robert Fisher, Flying Fish Studio – design

Charts

Weekly charts

Year-end charts

Certifications

References

2000 singles
Interscope Records singles
Music videos directed by Hype Williams
No Doubt songs
Song recordings produced by Glen Ballard
Songs written by Gwen Stefani
Songs written by Tom Dumont
Songs written by Tony Kanal